Burksville Station is an unincorporated community in the New Design Precinct of Monroe County, Illinois, United States. It grew up around a station on the St. Louis and Cairo Railroad.

References 

Unincorporated communities in Monroe County, Illinois
Unincorporated communities in Illinois
Metro East